Sergio López Alpáñez (born 22 July 1968) is a Spanish sprinter. He competed in the men's 4 × 100 metres relay at the 1992 Summer Olympics.

References

External links
 

1968 births
Living people
Athletes (track and field) at the 1992 Summer Olympics
Spanish male sprinters
Olympic athletes of Spain
People from Baix Vinalopó
Sportspeople from the Province of Alicante
20th-century Spanish people
21st-century Spanish people